Quedlinburg is a town situated just north of the Harz mountains, in the district of Harz in the west of Saxony-Anhalt, Germany. As an influential and prosperous trading centre during the early Middle Ages, Quedlinburg became a center of influence under the Ottonian dynasty in the 10th and 11th centuries. The castle, church and old town, dating from this time of influence, were added to the UNESCO World Heritage List in 1994 because of their exceptional preservation and outstanding Romanesque architecture.

Quedlinburg has a population of more than 24,000. The town was the capital of the district of Quedlinburg until 2007, when the district was dissolved. Several locations in the town are designated stops along a scenic holiday route, the Romanesque Road.

History

The town of Quedlinburg is known to have existed since at least the early 9th century, when there was a settlement known as Gross Orden on the eastern bank of the River Bode. It was first mentioned as a town in 922 as part of a donation by King Henry the Fowler (Heinrich der Vogler). The records of this donation were held by the abbey of Corvey.

According to legend, Henry had been offered the German crown at Quedlinburg in 919 by Franconian nobles, giving rise to the town being called the "cradle of the German Reich".

After Henry's death in 936, his widow Saint Matilda founded a religious community for women (Frauenstift) on the castle hill, where daughters of the higher nobility were educated. The main task of this collegiate foundation, Quedlinburg Abbey, was to pray for the memory of King Henry and the rulers who came after him. The Annals of Quedlinburg were also compiled there. The first abbess was Matilda, a granddaughter of King Henry and St. Matilda.

The Quedlinburg castle complex, founded by King Henry I and built up by Emperor Otto I in 936, was an imperial Pfalz of the Saxon emperors. The Pfalz, including the male convent, was in the valley, where today the Roman Catholic Church of St. Wiperti is situated, while the women's convent was located on the castle hill.

In 973, shortly before the death of Emperor Otto I, a Reichstag (Imperial Convention) was held at the imperial court in which Mieszko, duke of Polans, and Boleslav, duke of Bohemia, as well as numerous other nobles from as far away as Byzantium and Bulgaria, gathered to pay homage to the emperor. On the occasion, Otto the Great introduced his new daughter-in-law Theophanu, a Byzantine princess whose marriage to Otto II brought hope for recognition and continued peace between the rulers of the Eastern and Western empires.

In 994, Otto III granted the right of market, tax, and coining, and established the first market place to the north of the castle hill.

The town became a member of the Hanseatic League in 1426. Quedlinburg Abbey frequently disputed the independence of the town, which sought the aid of the Bishopric of Halberstadt. In 1477, Abbess Hedwig, aided by her brothers Ernest and Albert, broke the resistance of the town and expelled the bishop's forces. Quedlinburg was forced to leave the Hanseatic League and was subsequently protected by the Electorate of Saxony. Both town and abbey converted to Lutheranism in 1539 during the Protestant Reformation.

In 1697, Elector Frederick Augustus I of Saxony sold his rights to Quedlinburg to Elector Frederick III of Brandenburg for 240,000 thalers. Quedlinburg Abbey contested Brandenburg-Prussia's claims throughout the 18th century, however. The abbey was secularized in 1802 during the German Mediatisation, and Quedlinburg passed to the Kingdom of Prussia as part of the Principality of Quedlinburg. Part of the Napoleonic Kingdom of Westphalia from 1807 to 1813, it was included within the new Prussian Province of Saxony in 1815. In all this time, ladies ruled Quedlinburg as abbesses without "taking the veil"; they were free to marry. The last of these ladies was a Swedish princess, an early fighter for women's rights, Sofia Albertina.

During the Nazi regime, the memory of Henry I became a sort of cult, as Heinrich Himmler saw himself as the reincarnation of the "most German of all German" rulers. The collegiate church and castle were to be turned into a shrine for Nazi Germany. The Nazi Party tried to create a new religion. The cathedral was closed from 1938 and during the war. The local crematory was kept busy burning the victims of the Langenstein-Zwieberge concentration camp. Georg Ay was local party chief from 1931 until the end of the war. American occupation during the last months of World War II brought back the Protestant bishop and the church bells, and the Nazi-style eagle was removed from the tower.  However, in the 1980s, upon the death of one of the US military men, the theft of medieval art from Quedlinburg came to light.

Quedlinburg was administered within Bezirk Halle while part of the Communist East Germany from 1949 to 1990. It became part of the state of Saxony-Anhalt upon German reunification in 1990.

During Quedlinburg's Communist era, restoration specialists from Poland were called in during the 1980s to carry out repairs on the old architecture. Today, Quedlinburg is a center of restoration of Fachwerk houses.

Quedlinburg is the setting for the acclaimed 2016 Frantz, serving as a quintessential small German town in the wake of WWI, home to the family who is reeling from the death of a son in the war.

Geography

Location
The town is located north of the Harz mountains, about 123 m above NHN. The nearest mountains reach 181 m above NHN. The largest part of the town is located in the western part of the Bode river valley. This river comes from the Harz mountains and flows into the river Saale, a tributary of the river Elbe. Before the incorporation of the two (previously independent) municipalities of Gernrode and Bad Suderode in January 2014, it was only .

Divisions 
The town Quedlinburg consists of Quedlinburg proper and the following Ortsteile or municipal divisions:

Bad Suderode
Gernrode
Gersdorfer Burg
Morgenrot
Münchenhof
Quarmbeck

Neighbouring communities

Climate
Quedlinburg has an oceanic climate (Cfb) resulting from prevailing westerlies, blowing from the high-pressure area in the central Atlantic towards Scandinavia. Snowfall occurs almost every winter. January and February are the coldest months of the year, with an average temperature of 0.5 °C and 1.5 °C. July and August are the hottest months, with an average temperature of 17 °C (63 °F) and 18 °C (64 °F). The average annual precipitation is close to 438 mm with rain occurring usually from May to September. This precipitation is one of the lowest in Germany, which has an annual average hovering around 440  mm. In August 2010, Quedlinburg was the driest place in Germany, with only 72.4 L/m2.

Demographics

Governance
The mayor is Frank Ruch (CDU), elected in 2022.

Town twinning

Quedlinburg is twinned with:
 Aulnoye-Aymeries, France, since 1961
 Herford, Germany, since 1991
 Celle, Germany, since 1991
 Hameln, Germany, since 1991
 Hann. Münden, Germany, since 1991

Attractions
In the centre of the town are a wide selection of half-timbered buildings from at least five different centuries (including a 14th-century structure, one of Germany's oldest), while around the outer fringes of the old town are examples of Jugendstil buildings, dating from the late 19th and early 20th centuries.

The old town of Quedlinburg is among the largest in Germany with a size of around 90 hectares. 2000 half-timbered houses can be found here. The oldest, the "Ständerbau", dates back from 1347.

Another famous building is called "Klopstockhaus", the birthplace of poet Friedrich Gottlieb Klopstock.

Since December 1994, the old town of Quedlinburg and the castle mount with the Stiftskirche (collegiate church) are listed as one of UNESCO's World Heritage Sites. Quedlinburg is one of the best-preserved medieval and Renaissance towns in Europe, having escaped major damage in World War II.

In 2006, the Selke valley branch of the Harz Narrow Gauge Railways was extended to Quedlinburg from Gernrode, giving access to the historic steam narrow gauge railway, Alexisbad and the high Harz plateau.

The castle and Stiftskirche St. Servatius still dominate the town like in the early Middle Ages. The church is a prime example of German Romanesque style. The treasure of the church, containing ancient Christian religious artifacts and books, was stolen by an American soldier but brought back to Quedlinburg in 1993 and is again on display here.

The former Stiftskirche St. Wiperti was established in 936 when the Kanonikerstift St. Wigpertus (of male canons) was moved from the castle hill to make way for what became Quedlinburg Abbey. The church was built at the location of the first Ottonian Royal palace at Quedlinburg. Around 1020, a three-aisled crypt was added to the basilica. The crypt, which survived all later alterations to the church, is also a designated stop on the Romanesque Road today.

Infrastructure

Transport

Air
Much closer, but only served by a few airlines, is Magdeburg-Cochstedt. An airfield is located at Ballenstedt-Assmussstedt for general aviation.

Railway

Regional trains operated by Deutsche Bahn and the private Transdev company run on the standard-gauge Magdeburg–Thale line connecting Quedlinburg station with Magdeburg, Thale, and Halberstadt.

In 2006, the Selke Valley branch of the Harz Narrow Gauge Railways was extended into Quedlinburg from Gernrode, giving access via the historic steam-operated narrow-gauge railway to Alexisbad and the High Harz plateau.

Bus
Quedlinburg is connected by regional buses to the surrounding villages and small towns. Additionally, there are long-distance buses to Berlin.

Notable people 

 Johann Gerhard (1582–1637), theologian, mean Denter representatives of Lutheran orthodoxy
 Andreas Werckmeister (1645–1706), German theorist, organist, organ examiner and composer
 Wilhelm Homberg (1652–1715), naturalist, born apparently during a trip in Batavia / Jakarta, but parents living in Quedlinburg
 Dorothea Erxleben (1715–1762), was the first female medical doctor in Germany 
 Friedrich Gottlieb Klopstock (1724–1803), German poet and contemporary of Johann Wolfgang von Goethe
 Gottfried Christian Voigt (1740-1791), law clerk, antiquarian and influential writer about witchcraft
 Johann Christian Polycarp Erxleben (1744–1777), naturalist
 Johann Christoph Friedrich GutsMuths (1759–1839), father of German gymnastics
 Carl Ritter (1779–1859), founder of scientific geography
 Julius Wolff (1834–1910), Freeman, poet and writer
 Gustav Albert Schwalbe (1844–1916), anatomist and anthropologist
 Carl Schroeder (1848–1935), cellist, composer, conductor and Hofkapellmeister
 Georg Ay (1900–1997), politician (NSDAP), member of Reichstag 1933–1945
 Fritz Grasshoff (1913–1997), poet, painter, pop lyricist
 Bernhard Schrader (1931–2012), chemist, pioneer of experimental Raman and infrared spectroscopy
 Peter Kramer (born 1933), physicist
 Leander Haußmann (born 1959), film and theater director (e.g. "Sun Alley (film) Sonnenallee", "Herr Lehmann", "NVA")
 Petrik Sander (born 1960), football coach
 Petra Schersing (born Muller,  1965), sprinter and Olympic silver medalist
 Silvio Meier (1965–1992), activist killed by neo-Nazis
 Dagmar Hase (born 1969), swimmer and Olympic champion
 Sascha Ring (born 1978), electronic musician known as Apparat

References

Further reading

External links

 
 The town's official website 
 UNESCO page on Quedlinburg
 Pictures and information about timber frame houses in Quedlinburg 
 The Quedlinberg Art Affair

 
World Heritage Sites in Germany
Art and cultural repatriation
Landmarks in Germany
Romanesque Road
Members of the Hanseatic League